Chalsa may refer to:

Chalsa, India
Chalsa, Nepal